Benjamin Allen Glover (born June 1, 1978) is a songwriter and producer hailing from Loveland, Colorado, a small city on the edge of the Rocky Mountains. Glover moved to Nashville, Tennessee in 2000 after signing his first publishing deal the year prior.

Music career
Originally getting his start as an artist, Glover spent the early part of his career touring, but quickly discovered he preferred the lights of a studio to the ones on a stage so he chose to get off the road and focus his attention on the craft of writing and producing songs. The results of that decision proved successful as he has penned over thirty-five #1 hits in multiple genres of music and was named ASCAP's Christian Songwriter of the Year in 2010, 2012, 2013, 2015, and 2016.

Glover wrote the hit county songs, "Hard to Love" by Lee Brice and "Love Don't Run" by Steve Holy along with numerous hits in Christian music including, "All This Time" and "The Lost Get Found" by Britt Nicole, "Write Your Story" by Francesca Battistelli and Mandisa's songs "Stronger" and "Overcomer," The latter of which won a Grammy Award.

Along with his credits as a songwriter, Glover has achieved notable success as a producer, writing and producing for MercyMe, For King & Country, Danny Gokey, Mandisa, among others.

Associated acts
Glover has had over 400 songs recorded in multiple genres of music by artists such as Chris Tomlin, MercyMe, David Crowder, Trace Adkins, Gloriana, Thompson Square, The Backstreet Boys, Amy Grant & James Taylor, Chad Brownlee, Marc Broussard, Clay Walker, Joy Williams, Brandon Heath, Josh Wilson, The Afters, Colton Dixon, Newsboys, Kari Jobe and many others.

Dove Awards

Grammy Awards

Radio singles

References 

1978 births
Living people
American performers of Christian music
Record producers from Colorado
Record producers from Tennessee
Musicians from Colorado
Musicians from Nashville, Tennessee
Songwriters from Tennessee
People from Loveland, Colorado